Keskastel is a commune in the northwest of the Bas-Rhin department in Grand Est in north-eastern France.

Geography
Kernkastel is positioned on the banks of the Saar.   Surrounding communes are Herbitzheim and Sarralbe to the north with Schopperten and Sarre-Union to the south.

The village is the meeting point of several roads, the largest of them being the Route Nationale RN61 (Phalsbourg - Saarbrücken).   The A4 Autoroute (E25) passes to the east, at which point the village hosts a service area and there are a couple of bridges overlooking the autoroute, but there is no road access to the highway:  junctions 42 and 43 are approximately ten kilometres (six miles) to the north and south respectively.   The village does, however, have its own station on the local railway line.

One pillar of the local economy is tourism.  There is a camping place with a bathing area:  angling facilities are also available, and the village is positioned on a long distance walking path that tracks the Saar.

See also
 Communes of the Bas-Rhin department

References

Communes of Bas-Rhin
Bas-Rhin communes articles needing translation from French Wikipedia